Barbara Lang (born Barbara Jean Bly, March 2, 1928 – July 22, 1982) was an American actress and singer.

Early life

Lang was a student at Eagle Rock High School and acted in little theater. She worked a number of jobs prior to breaking into the entertainment industry. She sold jewelry in a Los Angeles department store and was a part-time fashion model at the age of seventeen. She was also a pianist and singer for a time in a cocktail lounge.

Illness
Lang suffered an attack of poliomyelitis in late 1953. She spent three weeks in the polio ward of Los Angeles General Hospital. Another eight months were required to convalesce. Lang was told that she might never walk again. She turned to the Bible during this time and credited faith for performing a miracle. Shortly after being stricken, her legs and facial muscles were paralyzed, and she had difficulty speaking. The lingering effect she experienced most was tiring easily.

Lang began singing in night clubs to pay her medical debts. She was a self-taught vocalist who trusted her accompanist to select each song's key and pitch. She eventually began singing regularly in Portland and San Francisco.

Career

Film
She first came to the attention of Hollywood producers with appearances in six Death Valley Days episodes (1955–1956). Half a dozen motion picture studios vied to sign Lang thereafter. In 1957, she signed a contract with Metro Goldwyn Mayer and was assigned to dramatic school. As a new star for MGM Lang played the feminine lead in House of Numbers (1957), co-starring with Jack Palance. It was filmed inside San Quentin Prison and in Mill Valley, California.

Lang was at first named to star opposite Elvis Presley in Jailhouse Rock. Before being cast the movie was tentatively entitled Jailhouse Kid. In the Joe Pasternak production of Party Girl (1958), Lang played "Ginger D'Amour", a Chicago showgirl of the 1930s.

Television
After surviving and recovering from polio, Lang went into television work. Her TV credits are numerous. She is in episodes of The Thin Man (1957), the episode "Escape to Tampico" in Maverick (1958), The Bob Cummings Show (1958), 77 Sunset Strip (1959), Lawman (1959), Tightrope! (1959), and Outlaws (1960), among others.

Personal life

In November 1958, Lang won an annulment of her two-year marriage to actor Alan Wells. The decree was granted on grounds that Wells had married Lang in Ensenada, Mexico, ten months before his divorce from actress Claudia Barrett was final. Lang and Wells met when she played in Death Valley Days.

Lang died at age 54 in 1982 reportedly from pneumonia.

Acting credits
Death Valley Days (1955–56) 3 appearances 
Hot Summer Night (1957) (uncredited) 
House of Numbers (1957) 
The Thin Man (1957) 1 episode
Maverick (1958) 1 episode 
Party Girl (1958) 
The Bob Cummings Show (1958) 1 episode 
77 Sunset Strip (1959) 1 episode 
Lawman (1959) 4 episodes 
Tightrope! (1959) 1 episode 
Outlaws (1960) 1 episode

References

 Burlington, North Carolina Daily Times-News, "Polio Didn't Stop Barbara Lang", April 26, 1957, Page 4.
 Long Beach Press-Telegram, November 11, 1956, Page 170.
 Lowell Sun, "Barbara Lang Wins Annulment", November 4, 1958, p. 6
 Oakland Tribune, "San Quentin Drama On Fox Screen", Friday, October 18, 1957, p. E45
 Syracuse Herald Journal, Hollywood and TV Close-Ups, June 1, 1958, p. 98

External links
 

1928 births
1982 deaths
20th-century American actresses
American television actresses
American film actresses
American stage actresses
Female models from California
Actresses from Hollywood, Los Angeles
20th-century American singers
20th-century American women singers